Count Tadeusz Jordan-Rozwadowski (19 May 1866 – 18 October 1928) was a Polish military commander, diplomat, and politician, a general of the Austro-Hungarian Army and then the Polish Army.

Biography

Youth 
Jordan-Rozwadowski was born in Babin, near Kałusz, Galicia, which formed part of the Austrian Empire (Austria-Hungary from 1867). The Jordan-Rozwadowski family was a member of the Polish nobility and a part of Traby clan (see Trąby coat of arms). The family obtained the title of count from the Habsburg Emperor Joseph II in 1783 in the nobility of the Holy Roman Empire and the Austrian nobility.

Tadeusz came from a family with a long military tradition. The 'Jordan' byname is a memento of a distant ancestor who during the Third Crusade was the first Pole to see the Jordan River. General's ancestor, Maciej Rozwadowski, showed bravery at the Battle of Vienna in 1683.  Tadeusz's great-grandfather,  Kazimierz Jordan-Rozwadowski, was a brigadier general under Kościuszko, and who fought against the last partition of Poland. While his grandfather, Viktor, fought in the November Uprising and was awarded the War Order of Virtuti Militari. His uncle Tadeusz was killed in the January Uprising, and his father Tomislav, fought in the January Uprising as a commander of the insurgent cavalry.

Officer in the Austro-Hungarian Army

Prior to the outbreak of World War I, he joined the Austro-Hungarian Army as an officer of artillery. He (and subsequently his son) was taught to ride at the famous Spanish Riding School in Vienna. For many years, Rozwadowski also served as the Austrian Military Attaché in Bucharest, Romania. In 1914 he became the commanding officer of the 12th Artillery Brigade attached to the Kraków-based 12th Infantry Division. A skilled commander, he then became the commanding officer of the 43rd Infantry Division, which he led during the victorious battle of Gorlice. For his merits in that battle he was awarded the Military Order of Maria Theresa. He is also credited with the discovery of an artillery barrage tactic called Feuerwaltze – "Fire-roller". In the Austro-Hungarian Army he rose to the rank of Feldmarschalleutnant.

Beginnings of the service in Polish forces
On October 26, 1918 Rozwadowski became the Regency Council-nominated chief of staff of the Polnische Wehrmacht. After Poland regained independence, on November 15 of that year he resigned his post – and was assigned to the same duty within the newly restored Polish Army a week later. Until March 19, 1919 he was also the commanding officer of the Polish Eastern Army fighting on the fronts of the Polish-Ukrainian War in Galicia.

Head of the Polish military missions to Paris, London, Rome
He was then dispatched to Paris, where he took part in the Polish delegation to the Peace Conference and was one of the people to sign the Versailles Peace Treaty. He also headed numerous Polish military missions to Paris, London and Rome. In June he became the official representative of Polish armed forces in Paris and was influential in obtaining international support for Poland (for example, the volunteers for the Polish-American Kościuszko Squadron).

Chief of Staff during the Battle of Warsaw
At the height of the Bolshevist Russian offensive in the Polish-Soviet War, on July 22, 1920, he returned to Poland and assumed the post of the Chief of General Staff and a member of the State Defence Council. Opinions among historians vary as to the extent he was responsible for developing the extremely successful plan for the battle of Warsaw that turned the tide of that war, also known as "Miracle at Vistula". Certainly he was considering a similar plan. Some argue, however that his input was even more important than that of Marshal of Poland, Józef Piłsudski, most often credited with turning the tide of the war. For his part in the war, Rozwadowski was awarded the Virtuti Militari (Classes II and V) and the Cross of the Valorous (four times).

After the end of hostilities he became the inspector-general of Polish cavalry units and authored the 1924 reform of the cavalry tactics and organization. He was also one of the early proponents of Polish tanks and airpower.  In March 1921, Jordan-Rozwadowski made use of his contacts in Bucharest to help start the Polish–Romanian alliance, by negotiating a Convention on Defensive Alliance.

Imprisoned after Piłsudski's coup

During the May Coup d'État of 1926 he was the commander of the forces loyal to the legal government and assumed the role of the military governor of Warsaw. He was responsible for all military actions of the government forces, including airstrikes that resulted in heavy casualties, including many fatal injuries (most victims were civilians). Air raids were ordered by Rozwadowski and organised by gen. Zagórski.
After the victory of Józef Piłsudski Rozwadowski was arrested in Warsaw on May 15, 1926 and transferred with four other detained generals to a military prison on Antokol in Wilno (Vilnius), where he was jailed in very strict conditions, in an unheated cell, for more than a year, until May 18, 1927. General Zagórski, the most important witness, disappeared in unknown circumstances in 1927.

The press of the time repeated imprecise and false accusations of improper financial dealings during his service in the army.  These allegations were never presented to him and remained only unsubstantiated rumors.

Death and the aftermath 
Soon after his release and retirement general Rozwadowski died under mysterious circumstances in a hospital in Warsaw.  He was buried, amid rumors of poisoning, with military honours at the Łyczaków Cemetery in Lwów (Lviv), among his fallen soldiers of the 1918–1919 Polish–Ukrainian War.

In the years following his death, the official Polish media sought to erase Tadeusz Rozwadowski's memory.  This policy also prevailed during the time of communist rule in Poland after World War II. Only since the fall of communism have historians in Poland been able to objectively question the circumstances of the Battle of Warsaw, as well as Rozwadowski's life and contributions to the history of Poland and Europe.

Family 
General Rozwadowski left behind a wife, a daughter, and a son. The greater part of his fortune was lost in a business venture to benefit the soldiers who fought under his command. His daughter, Melania Josefina, seems to have died under mysterious circumstances in the 1970s and never married.  The son, Jozef, was an artillery officer in the Polish Army and was also awarded the Virtuti Militari. In the 1930s, he was forced to resign his commission and emigrate to the United States due to his continued support for the pro-democratic and anti-Piłsudski forces in Poland. He emigrated to the United States and worked as an engineer and designed the elevators in the Empire State Building.  He also contributed to the design of the Polish Pavilion in the 1939 New York World's Fair and the 1964 World's Fair. He was survived by one daughter, Melanie Josephine, one granddaughter, Calia Brencsons-Van Dyk (see List of Latvians), and one great-grandson, Joseph, all living in the United States.

Honours and awards
 Commander's Cross of the Order of Virtuti Militari (previously awarded the  Silver Cross – 1921)
 Cross of Valour – four times
 Commander's Cross of the Order of Polonia Restituta
 Commander of the Legion of Honour (France)
 Grand Cross of the Order of the Crown of Romania
 Cross of Liberty, Class I (Estonia)
 Star of the Order of the White Lion
 Order of Maria Theresa Knight's Cross
 Grand Cross of the Order of Leopold with war decoration and swords
 Order of the Iron Crown 1st Class
 Order of Franz Joseph Officer
 Military Merit Cross 3rd Class with war decoration and swords
 Bronze Military Merit Medal with swords
 Long Service Cross for Officers
 1908 Jubilee Cross
 1898 Jubilee Medal
 Iron Cross 2nd Class

References 

 Tadeusz Kryska-Karski, Stanisław Żurakowski, Generałowie Polski niepodległej (Generals of independent Poland), Warszawa 1991
 Andrzej Suchcitz, Generałowie wojny polsko-sowieckiej 1919–1920. Mały słownik biograficzny (Generals of Polish-Soviet War 1919–1920. Small biographical dictionary), Białystok 1993

Further reading 
 R. Ulrych, "General Tadeusz Rozwadowski and the Attempt to Establish a Volunteer American Legion within the Polish Army, 1919–1920", The Polish Review, vol. XXXVII, no.1., 1992, p. 102-104
 Mariusz Patelski, Generał broni Tadeusz Jordan Rozwadowski: żołnierz i dyplomata (Generał broni Tadeusz Jordan Rozwadowski: soldier and diplomat), Warszawa 2002
 Mariusz Patelski, General Tadeusz Jordan Rozwadowski – soldier and diplomat, "Post Eagle" 7 V 2003, s. 2 i 6.

External links 

 Chief of General Staff of Polish Army, General Tadeusz Rozwadowski Papers. Description of archival collection in the Jozef Pilsudski Institute in New York
  Tadeusz Jordan-Rozwadowski. Extensive site with large gallery.
  "Zniszczony za życia" (Destroyed during life) by Jan Engelgard
  Generał Rozwadowski by Lech Maria Wojciechowski
  Nasz Generał – Tadeusz Jordan Rozwadowski

1866 births
1928 deaths
People from Ivano-Frankivsk Oblast
People from the Kingdom of Galicia and Lodomeria
Clan of Trąby
Polish generals
Polish generals in other armies
Austro-Hungarian Army officers
Diplomats of the Second Polish Republic
Polish people of World War I
Austro-Hungarian military personnel of World War I
Polnische Wehrmacht personnel
Polish people of the Polish–Ukrainian War
Polish people of the Polish–Soviet War
People of the Polish May Coup (pro-government side)
Commanders of the Virtuti Militari
Commanders of the Order of Polonia Restituta
Recipients of the Cross of Valour (Poland)
Commandeurs of the Légion d'honneur
Recipients of the Order of the Crown (Romania)
Grand Crosses of the Order of the Crown (Romania)
Recipients of the Order of the White Lion
Knights Cross of the Military Order of Maria Theresa